Andrew Allen (born 4 September 1974, Liverpool) is an English former footballer.

Allen made one appearance in The Football League for Chester City as a 17-year-old, when he replaced Neil Morton in a 1–0 defeat at Hull City on 9 November 1991. He remained with the club the following season but did not again feature for the first team and he dropped into non-league football with Colwyn Bay.

Bibliography

References

1974 births
Living people
English footballers
Association football wingers
English Football League players
Chester City F.C. players
Colwyn Bay F.C. players